The 1979–80 Scottish First Division season was won by Heart of Midlothian, who were promoted along with Airdrieonians to  the Premier Division. Arbroath and Clyde were relegated to the Second Division.

Table

References

Scottish First Division seasons
2
Scot